Gyeongju Yun clan was one of the Korean clans. Their Bon-gwan was in Gyeongju, North Gyeongsang Province. According to the research in 2000, the number of Gyeongju Yun clan was 1684. Gyeongju Yun clan was separated from Haeju Yun clan. He was a son of Yun Gong who was immigrated from Ming dynasty to Joseon during Taejo of Joseon’s reign. He was a nephew of Yun Sin who had a government post named (fuyin) in Ming dynasty.

See also 
 Korean clan names of foreign origin

References

External links 
 

 
Korean clan names of Chinese origin